The S-Bahn is the name of hybrid urban-suburban rail systems serving a metropolitan region predominantly in German-speaking countries. Some of the larger S-Bahn systems provide service similar to rapid transit systems, while smaller ones often resemble commuter or even regional rail systems. The name S-Bahn derives from Schnellbahn (lit. rapid train), Stadtbahn (lit. city train) or Stadtschnellbahn (lit. rapid city train). 

Similar systems in Austria and Switzerland are known as S-Bahn as well. In Belgium, it is known as S-Trein (Flemish) or Train S (French). In Denmark, they are known as S-tog , and in the Czech Republic as Esko or S-lines.

Characteristics 
There is no complete definition of an S-Bahn system. S-Bahn are, where they exist, the most local type of passenger train service that stops at all existing stations on mainline networks inside and around a city (while other mainline trains only call at major stations). They are slower than regional mainline trains but usually serve as fast crosstown services within the city. S-Bahn trains generally serve the hinterland of a certain city, rather than connecting different cities, although in high population density areas a few exceptions to this exist. A good example of such an exception is the Rhine-Ruhr S-Bahn, which interconnects the cities, towns and suburbs of the Ruhr, a large urban agglomeration. Most S-Bahn systems are entirely built on older local railways, or in some cases parallel to an existing dual track railway. Most use existing local mainline railway trackage, but a few branches and lines can be purpose-built S-Bahn lines. S-Bahn trains typically use overhead lines or a third rail for traction power. In Hamburg both methods are used, depending on which line is powered.

In smaller S-Bahn systems and suburban sections of larger ones, trains typically share tracks with other rail traffic, with the Berlin S-Bahn, Hamburg S-Bahn and Copenhagen S-train being notable exceptions. Busy S-Bahn corridors sometimes have sections of exclusive trackage of their own but parallel to mainline railways. Many of the larger S-Bahn systems will also have central corridors of exclusive trackage that individual suburban branches feed into, creating a high frequency trunk corridor. In many cases, the central corridor is a dedicated underground line in the city centre with close stop spacing and a high frequency, similar to metro systems, created from the combined interlining of the multiple branches. A good example of this is the Berliner Stadtbahn in the Berlin's S-Bahn, which is regarded as a tourist attraction. However, in more lightly used sections outside the city centre, S-Bahn services commonly share tracks with other trains.

Further out from the central parts of a city the individual services branch off into lines where the distances between stations can exceed 5 km, similar to commuter rail. This allows the S-Bahn to serve a dual transport purpose: local transport within a city centre and suburban transport between central boroughs of larger cities, and to suburbs. Frequencies vary wildly between systems with short headways in the core sections of large networks to headways of over 20 minutes in remote sections of the network, late at night and/or on Sundays and in smaller systems. The rolling stock typically used for S-Bahn systems reflects its hybrid purpose. The interior is designed for short journeys with provision for standing passengers but may have more space allocated to larger and more numerous seats. Integration with other local transport for ticketing, connectivity and easy interchange between lines or other systems like metros is typical for the S-Bahn. Where both S-Bahn and metro exist, the number of interchange stations between the two systems is substantial with metro tickets being valid on S-Bahn services, and vice versa. The S-Bahn Mitteldeutschland constitutes the main local railway system for Leipzig but also connects to Halle, where a few stations are located. The Rostock S-Bahn is an example of a smaller S-Bahn system.

Etymology

Germany, Austria and Switzerland 
The name S-Bahn is an abbreviation for the German "Stadtschnellbahn" (meaning "city rapid railway") and was introduced in December 1930 in Berlin. The name was introduced at the time of the reconstruction of the suburban commuter train tracks— the first section to be electrified was a section of the Berlin–Stettin railway from Berlin Nordbahnhof to Bernau bei Berlin station in 1924, leading to the formation of the Berlin S-Bahn.

The main line Berliner Stadtbahn (English: City railway of Berlin) was electrified with a 750 volt third rail in 1928 (some steam trains ran until 1929) and the circle line Berliner Ringbahn was electrified in 1929. The electrification continued on the radial suburban railway tracks along with changing the timetable of the train system into a rapid transit model with no more than 20 minutes headway per line where a number of lines overlapped on the main line. The system peaked during the 1936 Summer Olympics in Berlin to a train schedule below 2 minutes.

The idea of heavy rail rapid transit was not unique to Berlin. Hamburg had an electric railway between the central station ("Hauptbahnhof") and Altona which opened in 1906 and in 1934 the system adopted the S-Bahn label from Berlin. The same year in Denmark, Copenhagen's S-tog opened its first line. In Austria, Vienna had its Stadtbahn main line electrified in 1908 and also introduced the term Schnellbahn ("rapid railway") in 1954 for its planned commuter railway network (which started operations in 1962). The S-Bahn label was sometimes used as well, but the name was only switched to S-Bahn Wien in 2005. As for Munich, a first breaking ground for an S-Bahn-like rapid transport system, executed by the Nazi government of Adolf Hitler, took place in 1938 in Lindwurmstrasse near what is now Goetheplatz underground station (line U6). Said system was supposed to run through tunnels in downtown areas. The planning process mainly consisted of the bundling and interconnecting of existing suburban and local railways, plus the construction of a few new lines. Plans and construction work - including the building shell of Goetheplatz station - came to a very early halt during World War II and were not pursued in its aftermath. Very extensive nowadays, Munich's existing S-Bahn-System, together with the first two U-Bahn lines, began to operate prior to the 1972 Summer Olympics only.

The term S-Bahn was until 14 March 2012 a registered wordmark of Deutsche Bahn, where at the request of a transportation association the Federal Patent Court of Germany ordered the wordmark to be removed from the records of the German Patent and Trade Mark Office. Prior to the said event Deutsche Bahn collected a royalty of 0.4 cents per train kilometer for the usage of the said term.

Denmark 

The "S" stood for "station". Just before the opening of the first line in the Copenhagen S-train network, the newspaper Politiken on 17 February 1934 held a competition about the name, which in Danish became known as Den elektriske enquete or "The electrical survey" (as the Copenhagen S-trains would become the first electrical railways in Denmark). But since an "S" already was put up at all the stations, weeks before the survey, the result became S-tog which means "S-train". This was also just a few years after the S-trains had opened in Berlin and Hamburg. Today the Copenhagen S-trains uses six lines and serves 86 stations, 32 of them are located inside the (quite tiny) municipality borders. Each line uses 6 t.p.h (trains per hour) in each direction, with exception of the (yellow) F-line. The F-line has departures in each direction every five minutes, or 12 t.p.h. service .

History

Germany

Early steam services 
In 1882, the growing number of steam-powered trains around Berlin prompted the Prussian State Railway to construct separate rail tracks for suburban traffic. The Berliner Stadtbahn connected Berlin's eight intercity rail stations which were spread throughout the city (all but the Stettiner Bahnhof which today is a pure S-Bahn station known as Berlin Nordbahnhof; as the city Stettin today is Polish city Szczecin). A lower rate for the newly founded Berliner Stadt-, Ring- und Vorortbahn (Berlin City, Circular and Suburban Rail) was introduced on 1 October 1891. This rate and the growing succession of trains made the short-distance service stand out from other railways.

The second suburban railway was the Hamburg-Altonaer Stadt- und Vorortbahn connecting Hamburg with Altona and Blankenese. The Altona office of the Prussian State Railway established the electric powered railway in 1906.

Electricity 

The beginning of the 20th century saw the first electric trains, which in Germany operated at 15,000 V on overhead lines. The Berliner Stadt-, Ring- und Vorortbahn instead implemented direct current multiple units running on 750 V from a third rail. In 1924, the first electrified route went into service. The third rail was chosen because it made both the modifications of the rail tracks (especially in tunnels and under bridges) and the side-by-side use of electric and steam trains easier.

To set it apart from the subterranean U-Bahn, the term S-Bahn replaced Stadt-, Ring- und Vorortbahn in 1930.

The Hamburg service had established an alternating current line in 1907 with the use of multiple units with slam doors. In 1940 a new system with 1200 V DC third rail and modern electric multiple units with sliding doors was integrated on this line (on the same tracks). The old system with overhead wire remained up to 1955. The other lines of the network still used steam and later Diesel power. 
In 1934, the Hamburg-Altonaer Stadt- und Vorortbahn was renamed as S-Bahn.

Comparable systems

Austria 

The oldest and largest S-Bahn system in Austria is the Vienna S-Bahn, which predominantly uses non exclusive rails tracks outside of Vienna. It was established in 1962, although it was usually referred to as Schnellbahn until 2005. The white "S" on a blue circle used as the logo is said to reflect the layout of the central railway line in Vienna. However, it has now been changed for a more stylized version that is used all through Austria, except Salzburg. The rolling stock was blue for a long time, reflecting the logo colour, but red is used uniformly for nearly all local traffic today.

In 2004, the Salzburg S-Bahn went into service as the first Euroregion S-Bahn, crossing the border to the neighbouring towns of Freilassing and Berchtesgaden in Bavaria. The Salzburg S-Bahn logo is only different one, it is a white S on a light blue circle.

In 2006 the regional train line in the Rhine Valley in the state of Vorarlberg has been renamed to S-Bahn Vorarlberg. It is a three lines network, operated by the Montafonerbahn and the ÖBB.

The S-Bahn Steiermark has been inaugurated in December 2007 in Styria, built to connect its capital city Graz with the rest of the metropolitan area, currently the following lines are active: S1, S11, S3, S31, S5, S51, S6, S61, S7, S8 and S9. The network is operated by three railway companies: the Graz-Köflacher Bahn (GKB) (lines: S6, S61 and S7), the ÖBB (lines: S1, S3, S5, S51, S8 and S9) and the Steiermärkische Landesbahnen (StB) (lines: S11 and S31).

In December 2007 as well the Tyrol S-Bahn opened, running from Hall in Tirol in the east to Innsbruck Central Station and Telfs in the west and from Innsbruck to Steinach am Brenner. Class 4024 EMUs are used as rolling stock on this network.

In 2010 the S-Bahn Kärnten was opened in the state of Carinthia and currently consists of 4 lines operated by ÖBB.

The youngest network is the S-Bahn Oberösterreich in the Greater Linz area of the state of Upper Austria, which was inaugurated in December 2016. It is a 5 line system operated by Stern und Hafferl and the ÖBB.

Belgium 

The suburban railways of Brussels are being integrated into the Brussels Regional Express Network (French: Réseau Express Régional Bruxellois, RER; Dutch: Gewestelijk ExpresNet, GEN), which is identified by the letter S across both languages. In 2018, the S-train was also introduced in Antwerp, Ghent, Liège and Charleroi.

Czech Republic 

In the Czech Republic, integrated commuter rail systems exist in Prague and Moravian-Silesian Region. Both systems are called Esko, which is how S letter is usually called in Czech. Esko Prague has been operating since 9 December 2007 as a part of the Prague Integrated Transport system. Esko Moravian-Silesian Region began operating on 14 December 2008 as a part of the ODIS Integrated Transport system serving the Moravian-Silesian Region. Both systems are primarily operated by České dráhy. Several shorter lines are operated by other companies.

Denmark 

Copenhagen S-train connects the city centre, other inner and outer boroughs and suburbs with each other. The average distance between stations is 2.0 km, shorter in the city core and inner boroughs, longer at the end of lines that serve suburbs. Of the 86 stations, 32 are located within the central parts of the city. Some stations are located around 40 km from Copenhagen city centre. For this reason the fares vary depending on distances. The one-day passes which the tourists buy are valid only in the most central parts of the S-train system. On weekdays each line has a departure every 10 minutes with the exception of the F-line, on which a train departs every five minutes. Where several lines converge on a common piece of track there could be as many as 30 trains per hour in each direction. On Sundays the seven lines are reduced to four lines, but all stations are served at least every 10 minutes. The three railway stations at Amager have a local service that is the equivalent of the S-trains.

The Copenhagen Metro opened in 2002 as a complement to the already existing S-train system. Copenhagen's S-train system is the only one in the country. Outside Denmark, in cities where both exist, is it far from unusual that a metro system later has been complemented with S-trains. The branch towards Køge (the southernmost S-train station in Copenhagen's S-network) has a rather unique history, as it was built in the 1970s where no previous railway ever had existed.

Germany 

The trains of the Berlin and Hamburg S-Bahn systems ran on separate tracks from the beginning. When other cities started implementing their systems in the 1960s, they mostly had to use the existing intercity rail tracks, and they still more or less use such tracks.

The central intercity stations of Frankfurt, Leipzig, Munich and Stuttgart are terminal stations, so all four cities have monocentric S-Bahn networks. The S-Bahn trains use a tunnel under the central station and the city centre.

The high number of large cities in the Ruhr area promotes a polycentric network connecting all cities and suburbs. The S-Bahn Rhein-Ruhr, as it is called, features few tunnels, and its routes are longer than those of other networks. The Ruhr S-Bahn is the only S-Bahn network to be run by more than one corporation in Germany, and the Salzburg S-Bahn holds a similar distinction in Austria. Most Swiss S-Bahn systems are multi-corporation networks, however.

Most German S-Bahn networks have a unique ticket system, separated from the Deutsche Bahn rates, instead connected to the city ticket system used for U-bahns and local buses. The S-Bahn of Hanover, however, operates under five different rates due to its large expanse.

One S-Bahn system is no longer in operation: the Erfurt S-Bahn which operated from 1976 until 1993 and was an  single-line system which consisted of four stations from Erfurt Central Station to Erfurt Berliner Straße station in the then newly built northern suburbs of Erfurt.

There are several S-Bahn or S-Bahn-like systems in planning, such as the Danube-Iller S-Bahn and the Augsburg S-Bahn. The S-Bahn system in Lübeck is under discussion (see network plan).

The Stadtbahn Karlsruhe (a tram-train network) uses the green "S" logo, but does not refer to itself as S-Bahn. The blue U-Bahn logo is not used either, due to the lack of subterranean lines.

Despite its name, the Ortenau S-Bahn (Offenburg) is a Regionalbahn service.

The following networks are currently in operation:

Switzerland and Liechtenstein 
S-Bahn is also used in the German-speaking part of Switzerland. While French publications of those networks translate it as RER, the line numbers are still prefixed with an S (e.g., as S2), except for the Léman Express, which uses the prefix "L" (e.g., as L2). S-Bahn-style services in the Italian and Romansh speaking parts of Switzerland also use the "S" prefix, although in Italian such networks are called rete celere (lit. fast network) instead of S-Bahn.

The oldest network in Switzerland is the Bern S-Bahn, which was established in stages from 1974 onward and has adopted the term S-Bahn since 1995. It is also the only one in Switzerland to use a coloured "S" logo. In 1990, the Zürich S-Bahn, went into service. As of 2022, this network comprises 32 services, covering a large area in Switzerland (and parts of southern Germany). Further S-Bahn services were set up in the course of the Bahn 2000 initiative in Central Switzerland (a collaborative network of S-Bahn Luzern and Stadtbahn Zug), and Eastern Switzerland (S-Bahn St. Gallen). 

The Basel trinational S-Bahn services the Basel metropolitan area, thus providing cross-border transportation into both France and Germany. A tunnel connecting Basel's two large intercity stations (Basel Badischer Bahnhof and Basel SBB) is planned as Herzstück Regio-S-Bahn Basel (lit. heart-piece Regio-S-Bahn Basel).

An international S-Bahn network also existsts across the Swiss-Italian border, in the Swiss Canton of Ticino and the Italian state of Lombardy. Services are operated by Treni Regionali Ticino Lombardia (TILO), a joint venture between Italian railway company Trenord and Swiss Federal Railways (SBB CFF FFS).

The RER Vaud of Lausanne and the Léman Express of Geneva serve the area around Lake Geneva (fr. Lac Léman). The Léman express network expands across the Swiss-French border. It is the largest cross-country S-Bahn network of Europe. Léman express was launched in December 2019 and is operated by Swiss Federal Railways (SBB CFF FFS) and SNCF.

Another transborder network for the Lake Constance (Bodensee) area, connecting up to four nations, is under discussion. This network would extend across the German states Baden-Württemberg and Bavaria, the Austrian state Vorarlberg, the Principality of Liechtenstein (S-Bahn FL.A.CH), and the Swiss cantons of Appenzell Ausserrhoden, Appenzell Innerrhoden, Schaffhausen, St. Gallen and Thurgau. Possible names are Bodensee-S-Bahn and Alpenrhein-Bahn. Presently, an hourly service, S3 of Vorarlberg S-Bahn (ÖBB), connects Bregenz (A) with St. Margrethen (CH), and a less frequent service (S2) operates between Feldkirch (A), Schaan (FL) and Buchs SG (CH). The S14 and S44 services of S-Bahn St. Gallen both connect Konstanz (D) with Kreuzlingen and Weinfelden (both CH), and since 2022, some S7 services continue from Rorschach (CH) to Bregenz and Lindau-Reutin (D). Additional transborder services are planned. The future of S-Bahn Liechtenstein is uncertain since a voter referendum in 2020. 

The Chur S-Bahn provides services around Chur, the capital of the alpine Canton of Graubünden (Grisons) in south-eastern Switzerland.

The Aargau S-Bahn is a small network that services stations in the cantons of Aargau, Lucerne and Bern.

The RER Fribourg is an S-Bahn-style service centered at Fribourg/Freiburg and Bulle in the Canton of Fribourg, and extending into the cantons of Neuchâtel and Vaud.

Two unnumbered S-Bahn services (designated only with an "S"), one between Schaffhausen and Erzingen (D), running on railway tracks owned by Deutsche Bahn (DB), and one between Schaffhausen and Jestetten (D), opened in 2013. They are operated by SBB GmbH and THURBO, respectively. Since December 2022, the Schaffhausen–Singen am Hohentwiel line is also serviced by SBB GmbH.

Additionally, there are services designated "S" that are not part of any formal S-Bahn network. These include the S20, S21, and S22 operated by Swiss Federal Railways in Solothurn or the S27 operated by Südostbahn (SOB) between Siebnen-Wangen and Ziegelbrücke.

Swiss S-Bahn services are operated mostly by the Swiss Federal Railways (SBB CFF FFS) but also by private railway companies, such as Appenzeller Bahnen (AB), BLS AG, Forchbahn (FB), Regionalverkehr Bern-Solothurn (RBS), Rhätische Bahn (RhB), Sihltal Zürich Uetliberg Bahn (SZU), Südostbahn (SOB) or Zentralbahn (ZB).

Rail transport in Switzerland, including S-Bahn systems, is noteworthy for its coordination between services due to the clock-face schedule. Due to the proximity of the various S-Bahn systems in Switzerland, services of one network often offer connections to services of neighboring networks. S-Bahn services are used by commuters and tourists (some services call nearby tourist attractions, such as the Rhine Falls or the Swiss Museum of Transport).

See also 
 Commuter rail
 U-Bahn
 Urban rail transit
 Train categories in Europe
 List of suburban and commuter rail systems

References

External links